Oseyf (also Romanized as ‘Oseyf; also known as Haşayyef and Ḩaşīf) is a village in Abdoliyeh-ye Sharqi Rural District, in the Central District of Ramshir County, Khuzestan Province, Iran. At the 2006 census, its population was 167, in 23 families.

References 

Populated places in Ramshir County